Sixteen Fathoms Deep (also written as 16 Fathoms Deep) is a 1948 American adventure film directed by Irving Allen and starring Lloyd Bridges, Lon Chaney Jr. and Arthur Lake. It was a remake of the 1934 film of the same title in which Chaney had also starred.

Plot
Lloyd Douglas turns up to a town in Florida and gets work as a diver. He works for Captain Briacos.

Cast
 Lon Chaney Jr. as Mr. Demitri 
 Arthur Lake as Pete 
 Lloyd Bridges as Ray Douglas 
 Eric Feldary as Alex 
 Tanis Chandler as Simi 
 John Qualen as Capt. Athos 
 Ian MacDonald as Nick 
 Dickie Moore as George 
 Harry Cheshire as Uncle Mike 
 John Bleifer as Capt. Briakos

Production
The film was shot on location in Tarpon Springs, Florida.  It was to be shot in Ansco, a form of color stock.  It was intended to film only some footage in Florida and the rest in California but the footage would not match so it had to be shot entirely in Florida.

References

Bibliography
 Smith, Don G. Lon Chaney, Jr.: Horror Film Star, 1906–1973. McFarland, 2004.

External links
 

1948 films
1948 adventure films
1940s English-language films
American adventure films
Films directed by Irving Allen
Monogram Pictures films
Seafaring films
Remakes of American films
Films set in Florida
Films featuring underwater diving
Sponge diving
1940s American films